The James M. Carter and Judith N. Keep United States Courthouse at 333 West Broadway in San Diego, California, is a sixteen-story  federal courthouse facility on  that includes courtrooms, judges chambers, offices and courtroom galleries of the United States District Court for the Southern District of California, along with offices of the Internal Revenue Service and the General Services Administration.

History 
Construction was completed in 2012. When the building opened in March 2013 it was San Diego's third federal courthouse. It was named for two former judges of the court, James M. Carter and Judith N. Keep, at a ceremony on March 30, 2015. U.S. Representatives Susan Davis and Scott Peters sponsored the federal legislation to name the building for the two judges after surveying local community groups.

In March 2009, President Obama signed legislation allocating $110 million to build a new courthouse. The total cost of the new building was $368.7 million. The building is located to the west of the Edward J. Schwartz United States Courthouse, and north of the U.S. Bankruptcy Court.

Structure 
The building was designed by Michael Palladino of Richard Meier and Partners of New York. Natural lighting reaches all the interior spaces and some enjoy natural ventilation as well. The building "triumphs", wrote one critic, "as a graceful departure from the lumpish mediocrity of its neighbors, as a guardian of green space at the heart of the city, and by transforming public perceptions of the law in action". The San Diego Architectural Foundation criticized the GSA for demolishing an historically significant structure, the Hotel San Diego, to clear the land for construction of the courthouse. That hotel had been built in 1914 by sugar magnate John D. Spreckels, a key figure in the early development of the city.

The structure won a National Architecture and Engineering Award from the American Institute of Steel Construction and LEED Gold certification from the U.S. Green Building Council. The project also won an Award of Merit from Engineering News-Record in the Government/Public Building category of its California's Best Projects Competition for 2013. It received the San Diego Architectural Foundation Orchid Award, San Diego Architectural Foundation for 2013.

Artist and San Diego resident Robert Irwin produced two works on commission from the GSA. A 33-foot-tall highly polished obelisk called "Prism" is located in the lobby. It is constructed of transparent acrylic. A ramp of hedges that zigzag across the outdoor plaza is called "Hedge Wedge". Three large, boldly-colored panels by longtime San Diego artist Kim MacConnell have been installed in the Jury Assembly hall.

References

External links
Project Profile, Richard Meier and Partners
Michael Palladino
Photos, General Services Administration

Federal courthouses in the United States
Courthouses in California
Buildings and structures in San Diego
Leadership in Energy and Environmental Design gold certified buildings